The 2021 NAPA Auto Parts 150 was a ARCA Menards Series West race held on July 3, 2021. It was contested over 150 laps on the  short track oval. It was the third race of the 2021 ARCA Menards Series West season. Bill McAnally Racing driver Jesse Love, collected his first win of the season.

Background

Entry list 

 (R) denotes rookie driver.
 (i) denotes driver who is ineligible for series driver points.

Practice/Qualifying 
Practice and qualifying were combined into 75 minute long session, where the fastest recorded lap counts as a qualifying lap.

Starting Lineups

Race

Race results

References 

2021 in sports in California
NAPA Auto Parts 150
2021 ARCA Menards Series West